In cognitive psychology, cognitive load refers to the amount of working memory resources used. However, it is essential to distinguish it from the actual construct of Cognitive Load (CL) or Mental Workload (MWL), which is studied widely in many disciplines. According to work conducted in the field of instructional design and pedagogy, broadly, there are three types of cognitive load: intrinsic cognitive load is the effort associated with a specific topic; extraneous cognitive load refers to the way information or tasks are presented to a learner; and germane cognitive load refers to the work put into creating a permanent store of knowledge (a schema). However, over the years, the additivity of these types of cognitive load has been investigated and questioned. Now it is believed that they circularly influence each other.

Cognitive load theory was developed  in the late 1980s out of a study of problem solving by John Sweller. Sweller argued that instructional design can be used to reduce cognitive load in learners.
Much later, other researchers developed a way to measure perceived mental effort which is indicative of cognitive load. Task-invoked pupillary response is a reliable and sensitive measurement of cognitive load that is directly related to working memory. Information may only be stored in long term memory after first being attended to, and processed by, working memory. Working memory, however, is extremely limited in both capacity and duration. These limitations will, under some conditions, impede learning. Heavy cognitive load can have negative effects on task completion, and it is important to note that the experience of cognitive load is not the same in everyone. The elderly, students, and children experience different, and more often higher, amounts of cognitive load. 

The fundamental tenet of cognitive load theory is that the quality of instructional design will be raised if greater consideration is given to the role and limitations of working memory. 
With increased distractions, particularly from cell phone use, students are more prone to experiencing high cognitive load which can reduce academic success.

Theory
In the late 1980s, John Sweller developed cognitive load theory out of a study of problem solving, in order "to provide guidelines intended to assist in the presentation of information in a manner that encourages learner activities that optimize intellectual performance". Sweller's theory employs aspects of information processing theory to emphasize the inherent limitations of concurrent working memory load on learning during instruction. It makes use of the schema as primary unit of analysis for the design of instructional materials.

History
The history of cognitive load theory can be traced to the beginning of cognitive science in the 1950s and the work of G.A. Miller. In his classic paper, Miller was perhaps the first to suggest our working memory capacity has inherent limits.  His experimental results suggested that humans are generally able to hold only seven plus or minus two units of information in short-term memory.

In 1973 Simon and Chase were the first to use the term "chunk" to describe how people might organize information in short-term memory. This chunking of memory components has also been described as schema construction. 

In the late 1980s John Sweller developed cognitive load theory (CLT) while studying problem solving. Studying learners as they solved problems, he and his associates found that learners often use a problem solving strategy called means-ends analysis. He suggests problem solving by means-ends analysis requires a relatively large amount of cognitive processing capacity, which may not be devoted to schema construction. Sweller suggested that instructional designers should prevent this unnecessary cognitive load by designing instructional materials which do not involve problem solving. Examples of alternative instructional materials include what are known as worked-examples and goal-free problems.

In the 1990s, cognitive load theory was applied in several contexts. The empirical results from these studies led to the demonstration of several learning effects: the completion-problem effect; modality effect; split-attention effect; worked-example effect; and expertise reversal effect.

Types
Cognitive load theory provides a general framework and has broad implications for instructional design, by allowing instructional designers to control the conditions of learning within an environment or, more generally, within most instructional materials. Specifically, it provides empirically-based guidelines that help instructional designers decrease extraneous cognitive load during learning and thus refocus the learner's attention toward germane materials, thereby increasing germane (schema related) cognitive load. This theory differentiates between three types of cognitive load: intrinsic cognitive load, germane cognitive load, and extraneous cognitive load.

Intrinsic
Intrinsic cognitive load is the inherent level of difficulty associated with a specific instructional topic. The term was first used in the early 1990s by Chandler and Sweller. According to them, all instructions have an inherent difficulty associated with them (e.g., the calculation of 2 + 2, versus solving a differential equation). This inherent difficulty may not be altered by an instructor. However, many schemas may be broken into individual "subschemas" and taught in isolation, to be later brought back together and described as a combined whole.

Extraneous
Extraneous cognitive load is generated by the manner in which information is presented to learners and is under the control of instructional designers. This load can be attributed to the design of the instructional materials. Because there is a single limited cognitive resource using resources to process the extraneous load, the number of resources available to process the intrinsic load and germane load (i.e., learning) is reduced. Thus, especially when intrinsic and/or germane load is high (i.e., when a problem is difficult), materials should be designed so as to reduce the extraneous load.

An example of extraneous cognitive load occurs when there are two possible ways to describe a square to a student. A square is a figure and should be described using a figural medium. Certainly an instructor can describe a square in a verbal medium, but it takes just a second and far less effort to see what the instructor is talking about when a learner is shown a square, rather than having one described verbally. In this instance, the efficiency of the visual medium is preferred. This is because it does not unduly load the learner with unnecessary information. This unnecessary cognitive load is described as extraneous.

Chandler and Sweller introduced the concept of extraneous cognitive load. This article was written to report the results of six experiments that they conducted to investigate this working memory load. Many of these experiments involved materials demonstrating the split attention effect. They found that the format of instructional materials either promoted or limited learning. They proposed that differences in performance were due to higher levels of the cognitive load imposed by the format of instruction. "Extraneous cognitive load" is a term for this unnecessary (artificially induced) cognitive load.

Extraneous cognitive load may have different components, such as the clarity of texts or interactive demands of educational software.

Germane
Germane cognitive load is the processing, construction and automation of schemas. It was first described by Sweller, Van Merriënboer and Paas in 1998. While intrinsic cognitive load is generally thought to be immutable (although techniques can be applied to manage complexity by segmenting and sequencing complex material), instructional designers can manipulate extraneous and germane load. It is suggested that they limit extraneous load and promote germane load.

Until the 1998 article by Sweller, Van Merriënboer & Paas, cognitive load theory primarily concentrated on the reduction of extraneous cognitive load. With this article, cognitive load researchers began to seek ways of redesigning instruction to redirect what would be extraneous load, to now be focused toward schema construction (germane load). Thus it is very important for instructional designers to "reduce extraneous cognitive load and redirect learners' attention to cognitive processes that are directly relevant to the construction of schemas".

Measurement
As of 1993 Paas and Van Merriënboer had developed a construct known as relative condition efficiency, which helps researchers measure perceived mental effort, an index of cognitive load. This construct provides a relatively simple means of comparing instructional conditions, taking into account both mental effort ratings and performance scores. Relative condition efficiency is calculated by subtracting standardized mental effort from standardized performance and dividing by the square root of two.

Paas and Van Merriënboer used relative condition efficiency to compare three instructional conditions (worked examples, completion problems, and discovery practice). They found learners who studied worked examples were the most efficient, followed by those who used the problem completion strategy. Since this early study many other researchers have used this and other constructs to measure cognitive load as it relates to learning and instruction.

The ergonomic approach seeks a quantitative neurophysiological expression of cognitive load which can be measured using common instruments, for example using the heart rate-blood pressure product (RPP) as a measure of both cognitive and physical occupational workload. They believe that it may be possible to use RPP measures to set limits on workloads and for establishing work allowance.

Task-invoked pupillary response is a form of measurement that directly reflects the cognitive load on working memory. Greater pupil dilation is found to be associated with high cognitive load. Pupil constriction occurs when there is low cognitive load. Task-invoked pupillary response shows a direct correlation with working memory, making it an effective measurement of cognitive load explicitly unrelated to learning.

Some researchers have compared different measures of cognitive load.  For example, Deleeuw and Mayer (2008) compared three commonly used measures of cognitive load and found that they responded in different ways to extraneous, intrinsic, and germane load.   A 2020 study showed that there may be various demand components that together form extraneous cognitive load, but that may need to be measured using different questionnaires.

Established eye movement and pupillary response indicators of cognitive load are:
 pupillary diameter mean
 pupillary diameter deviation
 number of gaze fixations > 500 milliseconds
saccade speed
 pupillary hippus

Effects of heavy cognitive load

A heavy cognitive load typically creates error or some kind of interference in the task at hand. A heavy cognitive load can also increase stereotyping. Stereotyping is an extension of the Fundamental Attribution Error which also increases in frequency with heavier cognitive load. The notions of cognitive load and arousal contribute to the "Overload Hypothesis" explanation of social facilitation: in the presence of an audience, subjects tend to perform worse in subjectively complex tasks (whereas they tend to excel in subjectively easy tasks).

Sub-population studies

Individual differences
As of 1971, some evidence had been found that individuals systematically differed in their processing capacity. As of 1984 it was established for example, that there were individual differences in processing capacities between novices and experts. Experts have more knowledge or experience with regard to a specific task which reduces the cognitive load associated with the task. Novices do not have this experience or knowledge and thus have heavier cognitive load.

Elderly
The danger of heavy cognitive load is seen in the elderly population. Aging can cause declines in the efficiency of working memory which can contribute to higher cognitive load. Heavy cognitive load can disturb balance in elderly people. The relationship between heavy cognitive load and control of center of mass are heavily correlated in the elderly population. As cognitive load increases, the sway in center of mass in elderly individuals increases. An 2007 study examined the relationship between body sway and cognitive function and their relationship during multitasking and found disturbances in balance led to a decrease in performance on the cognitive task.  Conversely, an increasing demand for balance can increase cognitive load.

College students
As of 2014, an increasing cognitive load for students using a laptop in school has become a concern. With the use of Facebook and other social forms of communication, adding multiple tasks jeopardizes students performance in the classroom. When many cognitive resources are available, the probability of switching from one task to another is high and does not lead to optimal switching behavior. In a study from 013 oth students who were heavy Facebook users and students who sat nearby those who were heavy Facebook users performed poorly and resulted in lower GPA.

Children
In 2004, British psychologists, Alan Baddeley and Graham Hitch proposed that the components of working memory are in place at 6 years of age. They found a clear difference between adult and child knowledge. These differences were due to developmental increases in processing efficiency. Children lack general knowledge, and this is what creates increased cognitive load in children. Children in impoverished families often experience even higher cognitive load in learning environments than those in middle-class families. These children do not hear, talk, or learn about schooling concepts because their parents often do not have formal education. When it comes to learning, their lack of experience with numbers, words, and concepts increases their cognitive load.

As children grow older they develop superior basic processes and capacities. They also develop metacognition, which helps them to understand their own cognitive activities. Lastly, they gain greater content knowledge through their experiences. These elements help reduce cognitive load in children as they develop.

Gesturing is a technique children use to reduce cognitive load while speaking. By gesturing, they can free up working memory for other tasks. Pointing allows a child to use the object they are pointing at as the best representation of it, which means they do not have to hold this representation in their working memory, thereby reducing their cognitive load. Additionally, gesturing about an object that is absent reduces the difficulty of having to picture it in their mind.

Poverty
As of 2013 it has been theorized that an impoverished environment can contribute to cognitive load. Regardless of the task at hand, or the processes used in solving the task, people who experience poverty also experience higher cognitive load. A number of factors contribute to the cognitive load in people with lower socioeconomic status that are not present in middle and upper-class people.

Embodiment and interactivity
Bodily activity can both be advantageous and detrimental to learning depending on how this activity is implemented. Cognitive load theorists have asked for updates that makes CLT more compatible with insights from embodied cognition research. As a result, Embodied Cognitive Load Theory has been suggested as a means to predict the usefulness of interactive features in learning environments. In this framework, the benefits of an interactive feature (such as easier cognitive processing) need to exceed its cognitive costs (such as motor coordination) in order for an embodied mode of interaction to increase learning outcomes.

Application in driving and piloting
With increase in secondary tasks inside cockpit, cognitive load estimation became an important problem for both automotive drivers and pilots.  The research problem is investigated in various names like drowsiness detection, distraction detection and so on. For automotive drivers, researchers explored various physiological parameters like heart rate, facial expression, ocular parameters and so on. In aviation there are numerous simulation studies on analysing pilots’ distraction and attention using various physiological parameters. For military fast jet pilots, researchers explored air to ground dive attacks and recorded cardiac, EEG and ocular parameters.

See also
  
 Energy (psychological)
 
 
 
  (in scuba diving)

References

Further reading

Journal special issues 
For those wishing to learn more about cognitive load theory, please consider reading these journals and special issues of those journals:
 Educational Psychologist, vol. 43 (4)  
 Applied Cognitive Psychology vol. 20(3) (2006)
 Applied Cognitive Psychology vol. 21(6) (2007)
 ETR&D vol. 53 (2005)
 Instructional Science vol. 32(1) (2004)
 Educational Psychologist vol. 38(1) (2003)
 Learning and Instruction vol. 12 (2002)
 Computers in Human Behavior vol. 25 (2) (2009)

For ergonomics standards see:
 ISO 10075-1:1991 Ergonomic Principles Related to Mental Workload – Part 1: General Terms and Definitions
 ISO 10075-2:1996 Ergonomic Principles Related To Mental Workload – Part 2:  Design Principles
 ISO 10075-3:2004 Ergonomic Principles Related To Mental Workload – Part 3: Principles And Requirements Concerning Methods For Measuring And Assessing Mental Workload
 ISO 9241 Ergonomics of Human System Interaction

Cognition
Cognitive psychology
Educational psychology
Educational technology
Learning
Pedagogy
Psychological methodology